Vik is a surname. People with the surname include:

Anne Petrea Vik (born 1933), Norwegian politician 
Arnfinn Vik (1901–1990), Norwegian politician
Bjarte Engen Vik (born 1971), Nordic combined skier
Bjørg Vik (1935–2018), Norwegian writer
Frithjov Meier Vik (1902–1986), Norwegian politician 
Ingebrigt Vik (1867–1927), Norwegian sculptor
Jakob Nilsson Vik (1882–1960), Norwegian politician
Knut Severin Jakobsen Vik (1892–1972), Norwegian politician 
Maya Vik, Norwegian musician
Oddmund Vik (1858–1930), Norwegian politician
Ragnar Vik (1893–1941), Norwegian sailor
Robin Vik (born 1980), Czech tennis player

See also
 Vic (name)

Norwegian-language surnames